Eskinder Nega (Ge'ez: እስክንድር ነጋ, born 7 November 1970) is an Ethiopian journalist, blogger and politician who has been jailed at least ten times by the Ethiopian government on convictions for treason and terrorism.

Early life
Eskinder was born to highly educated parents, his father having done graduate work at Rutgers University and his mother at the American University of Beirut. They eventually divorced and his mother, with whom Eskinder lived, opened a clinic. Eskinder is of Amhara ethnic heritage.

Eskinder attended Sandford School in Addis Ababa. Eskinder moved to the United States in 1980s where he attended college,  then studied economics at American University.

Career 
Eskinder returned to Ethiopia in 1991 after the Marxist Derg was ousted by EPRDF forces.In fact he became one of the adversaries to the regime in the years to come He founded his first newspaper, Ethiopis, in 1993.
He also founded other newspapers such as, Askual, Satenaw, and Menelik.

2005: Treason conviction 
As editor of the newspaper Satenaw, Eskinder was arrested on 28 November 2005 following demonstrations against the results of the Ethiopian general election on 15 May 2005. Nega was charged with the capital offenses of treason, "outrages against the Constitution" and "incitement to armed conspiracy". Amnesty International designated him a prisoner of conscience, "detained solely for exercising his right to freedom of expression", and called for his immediate release. The group also protested the "poor and unsanitary" conditions of his detention at Karchele prison.

Eskinder was found guilty and served seventeen months' imprisonment before being released by presidential pardon at the end of 2007. Following the conviction, Nega's license to practice journalism was revoked and his newspaper was closed by authorities in 2007. He instead he began to publish online.

2012: Terrorism conviction 
Eskinder was arrested again along with four politicians on 14 September 2011 after publishing a column that criticized both the Ethiopian government's detainment of journalists as suspected terrorists and its arrest of Ethiopian actor and activist Debebe Eshetu. Ethiopian anti-terrorism legislation prohibits "any reporting deemed to 'encourage' or 'provide moral support' to groups and causes the government deems 'terrorists'".

Eskinder and his co-defendants, including Andualem Aragie, were accused of involvement in Ginbot 7, a group that was recently added to Ethiopian list of terrorist organizations. In November, he and his co-defendants were accused by state media of being "spies for foreign forces". He was found guilty of terrorism charges on 23 January 2012. On 13 July 2012, Eskinder was sentenced to eighteen years in jail on charges of terrorism. In 2013, a UN panel found Eskinder Nega's jailing a violation of international law.

After delaying a decision on seven occasions, Ethiopian Supreme Court upheld Eskinder's 18-year sentence on 1 May 2013. On 24 July 2013, Eskinder's "Letter from Ethiopia's Gulag" was published as a New York Times op-ed.

2018–2020: Release, further arrests and release again 
In January 2018, the prison holding Eskinder Nega was announced to be shut down, with political prisoners freed in order to "foster national reconciliation". He was only allowed freedom if he signed a confession saying that he was a member of the Ginbot 7 group designated terrorists by the federal government; but Eskinder refused, saying that it was a false confession. Eskinder Nega was freed on 14 February 2018, along with several other political prisoners. He then launched Ethiopis, a weekly Amharic newspaper.

On the evening of 25 March 2018, the Ethiopian Security Forces have re-arrested  Eskinder and other journalists and politicians at a social event outside the capital, Addis Ababa. Eskinder was accused of displaying a prohibited national flag and gathering in violation of an official state of emergency but was later released without a charge on the evening of 5 April after spending twelve days of unwarranted, inhumane imprisonment.

In September 2019, Eskinder Nega founded Balderas for True Democracy Party.

On 25 April 2020, Eskinder was once again arrested by Addis Ababa Police on grounds that are yet to be specified but released the same day. On 30 June 2020, he was arrested again during the Hachalu Hundessa riots for inciting violence and chaos.

On 7 January 2022, during Ethiopian Christmas, Eskinder Nega has been freed after one and half year in prison.

On 20 April 2022, Eskinder and other members of Balderas for True Democracy Party were arrested in Arba Minch town while the party was gathering signatures to expand their party to other areas outside of Addis Ababa.

Awards and honors 
2012 PEN/Barbara Goldsmith Freedom to Write Award
2014 World Association of Newspapers' Golden Pen of Freedom Award 
2017 International Press Institute World Press Freedom Hero
2018 Oxfam Novib/PEN Award

References 

1969 births
Amnesty International prisoners of conscience held by Ethiopia
Ethiopian journalists
Ethiopian prisoners and detainees
Living people
Ethiopian bloggers
People convicted of treason
Recipients of Ethiopian presidential pardons